Simonet Biokou is a Beninois Vodou artist. He is based in Porto Novo, Benin, where Vodou (or Voodoo) is an official religion practiced by 40% of the population.

Biokou is noted for his work using scrap metals, including the rims of wheels and bicycle chains, bolts, and springs, which he uses mainly to make metal works of Voodoo gods. The artist has frequently exhibited in Africa, Europe, and Canada. He is the only African Biokou sculptor exhibited at the Contemporary art Museum of Liège.

Biokou played himself in the 1998 film Divine Carcasse.

References

Beninese artists
Voodoo artists
Living people
Year of birth missing (living people)